Peter Árpád Kaplony (June 15, 1933 in Budapest – February 11, 2011 in Zurich) was a Hungarian-born Swiss egyptologist.

Life
Kaplony, son of a Hungarian military officer, emigrated to Switzerland as a child in December 1944. He became a Swiss citizen in 1958. He studied Ancient History, Egyptology, Arabic language and Arabic literature in the University of Zurich and University of Basel. He participated in the excavations of the Sun temple of Userkaf in Abusir from 1954 until 1957 with a joint Swiss and German team of archeologists.
In 1959, he was awarded the degree of Doctor of Philosophy in Zurich and, in 1964, his Habilitation.

From 1970 until his retirement in 2000, Kaplony was assistant professor and then professor emeritus of Egyptology at the Oriental Institute of the University of Zurich. His studies were especially focused on the pre-dynastic and early dynastic periods of Egypt and he published mostly in German and Swiss research journals.

Publications 
 The Egyptian inscriptions of the early days. 4 volumes, Harrassowitz, Wiesbaden from 1963 to 1964
 The cylinder seals of the Old Kingdom. La Fondation Reine Élisabeth Égyptologique, Brussels 1981

References 

 Kaplony at the University of Zurich, with a link to the publication list
 Some publications by Kaplony

External sources
 Morris L. Bierbrier: Who was who in Egyptology, 4th revised edition. Egypt Exploration Society, London (2012), page 289.

1933 births
2011 deaths
Hungarian emigrants to Switzerland
University of Zurich alumni
Hungarian Egyptologists
Swiss Egyptologists
Academic staff of the University of Zurich